Herbert Bailey Hayman (10 May 1873 – 31 July 1930) was an English first-class cricketer who played principally for Middlesex and the Marylebone Cricket Club between 1893 and 1901.

Career
Hayman, a right-handed batsman scored 4663 runs at an average 26.49. His bowling produced four wickets at an average of 34.50.

References

1873 births
1930 deaths
People from Willesden
English cricketers
Marylebone Cricket Club cricketers
Middlesex cricketers
Gentlemen cricketers
A. J. Webbe's XI cricketers